The River Brock is a river running through the county of Lancashire in England.

Commencing its journey on Fair Snape Fell, the infant River Brock runs beneath the Bleasdale Circle before continuing via Claughton and Bilsborrow to St Michael's On Wyre, where it joins the River Wyre. A significant length of River Brock forms the northern boundary of City of Preston, Lancashire.

Tributaries
New Draught
Old River Brock
Bacchus Brook
Bull Brook
Withney Dike
Woodplumpton Brook
Swill Brook
Blundel Brook
New Mill Brook
Barton Brook
Dean Brook
Sparling Brook
Factory Brook
Westfield Brook
Mill Brook
Whinnyclough Brook
Bullsnape Brook
Lickhurst Brook
Huds Brook
Winsnape Brook
Clough Heads Brook

References

External links

Brock, River
River Brock
1Brock